Subi Ablimit (born 13 February 2002) is a Chinese footballer currently playing as a defender for Jiangxi Beidamen.

Career statistics

Club
.

Notes

References

2002 births
Living people
Chinese footballers
China youth international footballers
Association football defenders
China League Two players
Shandong Taishan F.C. players